The FIM Sidecarcross World Championship is an annual event, organised by the Fédération Internationale de Motocyclisme (FIM) and held since 1980.

Previous to that, a European competition was held from 1971 onwards, first the FIM Cup and then, from 1975, the FIM European Championship.
 
All races held since the competitions interception in 1971 were staged in Europe and almost all riders hail from this continent. As World Championship winning riders is concerned, the competition is dominated by a small number of countries, with World Champions coming exclusively from Germany, the Netherlands, Switzerland, Latvia and Belgium.

Champions
The top-three teams season-by-season were:

FIM Cup
The FIM Cup was the first incarnation of the competition, held from 1971 to 1974:

FIM European Championship
From 1975 to 1979, the competition was called the FIM European Championship:

FIM World Championship
Since 1980, the competition runs under the name of FIM World Championship:

 Passengers in italics.

Statistics

GP winning drivers
The number of races has historically. This leads to the Grand Prix winners table being somewhat in favour of the more recent riders, early seasons having had only a small number of races.

Every race weekend now consists of two races, with the best team out of the two becoming the week ends Grand Prix winner. In some earlier seasons, race weekends were also staged in three separate races.

Listed are all Grand Prix winning drivers up until the end of the 2015 season:

 Bold denotes driver was active in the 2015 World Championship.
 Results are for 1971 to 2015.

Countries
The overwhelming majority of Grand Prix winners hail from the five countries that also have provided a World Champion. These five also sit at the top of the list of countries having held Grand Prix, alongside France and the United Kingdom, who are without a World Championship:

GP wins per country
 

 Results are for 1971 to 2015.

GP's held by country

 GP's figures are for 1971 to 2015.

GP Locations
In the history of the competition from 1971 to 2015, races have been held in 157 different locations, with Malpartida de Cáceres and Stelpe having been new additions for 2015:

 Figures are for 1971 to 2015.

Top-ten finishers in the World Championship 
The drivers (excluding passengers) finishing in the top-ten and their season-by-season finish:

1980 to 1999
The first twenty seasons of the World Championship:

2000 to present
The seasons of the World Championship since 2000:

Key

References

External links
 The official FIM website
 The John Davey Grand Prix Pages
 The World Championship on Sidecarcross.com

Sidecarcross World Championship
Sidecarcross World Championship records and statistics